Mel is a surname. Notable people with the surname include:

Mele Mel (born Melvin Glover in 1961), hip-hop musician and songwriter
Pepe Mel (born 1963), Spanish retired footballer and current manager of Real Betis
Ashantha de Mel (born 1959), Sri Lankan former cricketer
Henry De Mel (1877–1936), Ceylonese industrialist and politician
Lakdasa De Mel, first Bishop of Kurunegala, Sri Lanka, and son of Henry De Mel
Ronnie de Mel (born 1925), Sri Lankan politician and civil servant
Royce de Mel (1917–?), first Sri Lankan commander of the Sri Lanka Navy
Ruby de Mel (1917–2004), Sri Lankan actress
Samantha de Mel (born 1965), Sri Lankan-born Italian former cricketer
Rinaldo del Mel (probably 1554 – c. 1598), Franco-Flemish composer